The Céor is a  long river in the Aveyron department in southern France. It flows generally west-southwest. It is a left tributary of the Viaur, into which it flows at Saint-Just-sur-Viaur.

Communes along its course
This list is ordered from source to mouth: 
Aveyron: Salles-Curan, Arvieu, Salmiech, Cassagnes-Bégonhès, Centrès, Rullac-Saint-Cirq, Meljac, Saint-Just-sur-Viaur

References

Rivers of France
Rivers of Occitania (administrative region)
Rivers of Aveyron